Bismarckstraße is a Berlin U-Bahn station on lines U2 and U7, located in the Charlottenburg district. It was opened in 1978 on the eponymous street, a major arterial road named after Otto von Bismarck.

History
At the time when the first U-Bahn line (Stammstrecke) opened in 1902, the road was laid out in a lavish boulevard style as the western continuation of Charlottenburger Chaussee (now Straße des 17. Juni) and part of a direct connection between the Berlin city centre at Brandenburg Gate to the western suburbs of Charlottenburg and Spandau along Kaiserdamm and Heerstraße. On 14 December 1902, Knie station opened at present-day Ernst-Reuter-Platz; the western extension to Bismarckstraße (now Deutsche Oper) and the Wilhelmplatz (now Richard-Wagner-Platz) terminus near Charlottenburg Town Hall was inaugurated on 14 May 1906.

On 29 March 1908, the western continuation of the present-day U2 to Reichskanzlerplatz (now Theodor-Heuss-Platz) in Westend was opened. It branched off at Bismarckstraße, which remained the original name of present-day Deutsche Oper station until 1929.

The old tunnel at the site was completely rebuilt as a reinforced concrete construction, with the new U7 tunnel running under it in a north-south direction. The station was opened with the new U7 section on 28 April 1978.

Bismarckstraße station is currently undergoing an overall refurbishment.

References

U2 (Berlin U-Bahn) stations
U7 (Berlin U-Bahn) stations
Buildings and structures in Charlottenburg-Wilmersdorf
Railway stations in Germany opened in 1978